Casey Peter Wiegmann (born July 20, 1973) is a former American football center who played sixteen seasons in the National Football League (NFL).  He played college football for the University of Iowa.  He was signed by the Indianapolis Colts as an undrafted free agent in 1996, and has also played for the New York Jets, Chicago Bears, and Denver Broncos and Kansas City Chiefs.

College career
As a University of Iowa student-athlete, Wiegmann played for the Iowa Hawkeyes football team.  He started every game his senior year, with a total of 27 career starts as a center for the Hawkeyes.

Professional career
Wiegmann played for the New York Jets, Chicago Bears and Kansas City Chiefs before joining the Denver Broncos in 2008.  He started all 16 games for the Broncos during the 2008 season.  He has a 127-game starting streak, which is the longest streak among all active NFL centers.  Wiegmann was part of a Broncos offensive line that tied the Tennessee Titans for the fewest sacks given up during the regular season. In January 2009, Wiegmann was chosen to play in the 2009 Pro Bowl as an alternate. He replaced an injured Kevin Mawae.  The Pro Bowl selection was the first of Wiegmann's career.

Wiegmann was released by the Broncos on February 23, 2010. He was signed by the Kansas City Chiefs, his former team, on March 12, 2010.
When Wiegmann retired, his consecutive snap count was more than 11,000.

Personal life
Wiegmann and Kansas native Danni Boatwright of Survivor: Guatemala fame had their first child on October 8, 2007. In late May 2008, his hometown of Parkersburg was destroyed by an EF5 tornado. On June 19, he and Aaron Kampman appeared in Parkersburg to help the town recover.

References

External links
Denver Broncos bio

1973 births
Living people
American Conference Pro Bowl players
American football centers
Chicago Bears players
Denver Broncos players
Iowa Hawkeyes football players
Kansas City Chiefs players
New York Jets players
People from Parkersburg, Iowa
Players of American football from Iowa